Conny Nimmersjö, (born 1967) Swedish musician most known for playing guitar with bob hund and Bergman Rock.

Biography
Nimmersjö was born in Ängelholm and raised in Södertälje. in 1991 Nimmersjö along with Thomas Öberg, Johnny Essing, Mats Hellquist, Jonas Jonasson and Mats Andersson formed bob hund in Stockholm. After a crowded show at the Hultsfred Festival in 1993 the band signed a record deal with Silence Records. Throughout the years bob hund has released several records and attracted a large following including Blur guitarist Graham Coxon. The band has also released two albums as their English alter ego Bergman Rock.

Apart from being a member in bob hund and Bergman Rock, Conny Nimmersjö is a regular guitarist with Joakim Thåström, Pelle Ossler and Pugh Rogefeldt both during live performances and recording sessions. In October 2007, Conny Nimmersjö released his debut album as a solo artist; Skörheten och oljudet. The record was praised in the media and Nimmersjö followed up with a Swedish tour, partly with a group of session musicians and partly on his own.

Discography
With bob hund
bob hund (1) (1993)
bob hund (2) (1994)
Jag rear ut min själ! Allt skall bort!!! (1998)
bob hund sover aldrig (1999)
Stenåldern kan börja (2001)
10 år bakåt & 100 år framåt (2002)
Folkmusik för folk som inte kan bete sig som folk (2009)

With Bergman Rock
Bergman Rock (2003)
Bonjour Baberiba Pt II (2005)

With Thåström
Skebokvarnsv. 209 (2005)
Kärlek är för dom (2009)

As a solo artist
Skörheten och oljudet  (Dust Music), CD, 2007
Tänk, nyss var här så trevligt (Novoton), CD and LP, 2015

Other appearances
And The Lefthanded - And The Lefthanded (2002)
Fredrik Saroea And The Fredrik Saroeas - Chamonix Et Paris (2003)
And The Lefthanded - In The Kingdom Of Shadows (2004)

References
Georg Cederskog Musiken som medicin dn.se Retrieved: 2009-08-04
Conny Nimmersjö biography bobhund.nu Retrieved: 2009-08-04
bob hund history bobhund.nu Retrieved: 2009-08-04
Anders Lokko Conny Nimmersjö - Skörheten och odjuret svd.se Retrieved: 2009-08-04
Håkan Stern Coxon piggnar till mot slutet aftonbladet.se Retrieved: 2009-08-04
Jonas Appelqvist Här kommer all känslorna dagensskiva.com Retrieved: 2009-08-04

External links
Official MySpace
Official bob hund Website

1967 births
Living people
Swedish rock guitarists